Robert Henry Weale (16 December 1905 – 8 December 1952) was a Welsh footballer who played as an outside right for various clubs in England and Wales in the 1920s and 1930s.

Football career

West Ham United
Weale was born in Troed-y-rhiw in Glamorgan and after playing youth football for Merthyr Tydfil he was signed by West Ham United in March 1925. He made his first team debut on 10 October 1925, replacing Tommy Yews in a 1–0 victory over Notts County. He only made three First Division appearances for the "Hammers" in his two years with the club, before being transferred to Swindon Town in June 1927.

Swindon Town
He made his Swindon Town debut on 17 September 1927 in a Third Division South match against Charlton Athletic (drawn 2–2). Weale was unable to displace the long serving Bertie Denyer on the right wing and it was only in April 1928 that he had a run in the first team when he played five matches, initially on the left (replacing Alec Thom) before switching to his favoured right wing. In the following season, he replaced Denyer for a run of thirteen matches from September, in which he scored seven goals (including twice against both Brighton & Hove Albion and Torquay United in consecutive matches). Once Denyer returned from injury in early December, Weale was transferred to Southampton.

Southampton
The "Saints" paid a then club record of £1000 to bring Weale to The Dell having been watching him for some time. He immediately replaced Bert Jepson in the No. 7 shirt and made his debut on 8 December 1928 in a 1–1 draw at Clapton Orient. A "fast, clever right winger", he made a promising start to his Southampton career, and scored a hat trick in a 4–0 victory over Notts County on Boxing Day, following this with goals in the next two matches. His crosses helped the centre-forwards, Willie Haines (in 1928–29) and Dick Rowley (in 1929–30) to score 16 and 25 goals respectively.

By the middle of the 1929–30 season, Weale's form had become erratic and he lost his place to Jepson. Despite this, the club offered him a new contract in the summer of 1930, with terms of £5 per week (both winter and summer) rising to £8 per week when in the first team. Weale declined the contract and decided to move back to Wales.

Later career
Weale spent the 1930–31 season with Cardiff City, for whom he made only five appearances before a spell in non-league football. He subsequently played for Newport County and Wrexham and then travelled to Belfast to join Glentoran, before finishing his career back in the lower leagues in England.

Family
His younger brother, Tom, was also a professional footballer who had an unsuccessful trial with Southampton in 1929, before joining Swindon Town. He subsequently had long spells with Crewe Alexandra and Burnley.

References

External links
West Ham United profile
Swindon Town profile

1905 births
1952 deaths
Bath City F.C. players
Association football forwards
West Ham United F.C. players
Cardiff City F.C. players
Boston United F.C. players
Guildford City F.C. players
Newport County A.F.C. players
Wrexham A.F.C. players
Glentoran F.C. players
Cheltenham Town F.C. players
People from Troed-y-rhiw
Sportspeople from Merthyr Tydfil County Borough
Swindon Town F.C. players
Southampton F.C. players
Footballers from Merthyr Tydfil
English Football League players
Welsh footballers